Inga alba is a species of tree from the family Fabaceae, native to Central and South America. The common name in English is white inga.

Description
Inga alba can grow up to 40 m in height. It has red bark and 4 to 5 leaf pairs (occasionally 3 or 6 pairs), with the distal pair 6.1–10 cm long and 2.5—7.7 cm wide. The rachis is 5—13.5 cm long and wingless.  The glands are cone-shaped, the stipules obsolete. The inflorescences are short, the shaft is 4–20 mm long and the rachis 5–8 mm long.  The flowers are pale green and the stamen are white.  The fruits are flat up to 14 cm long and 2 cm wide. It flowers between August and November and bares fruit between January and March.

Distribution

Inga alba's distribution ranges from Mexico and Central America down to Peru, Bolivia and Brazil in South America.

Classification
The species was in originally described in 1788 by Olof Swartz as Mimosa alba. It was placed in the genus Inga in 1806 by  Carl Ludwig von Willdenow.

References

External links

alba
Trees of South America
Trees of Central America
Trees of Mexico